QuickSynergy is a graphical interface (GUI) for OS X and Linux for easily configuring Synergy. Synergy is an application that allows the user to share the mouse and keyboard between two or more computers. Without the need for any external hardware, Synergy uses the TCP/IP protocol to share the keyboard and mouse, between machines with different operating systems, such as Mac OS, Linux, and Windows.

The configuration of the host machine (server - the one which have mouse and keyboard attached to) only requires specifying the name of the client, which will be controlled when the mouse will leave the host screen, in the box at one of the four direction (left, right, above or below). The client configuration requires only specifying the name of the host.

More specific configuration is possible when using Synergy command-line programs (synergys and synergyc) without use of graphical interface.

Licensed under the GNU General Public License, QuickSynergy is free software.

External links
Google Code project page

Free software programmed in C
Free system software